Finding Jenua is an American film written, produced and directed by Alison Mason. The drama features Leigh Rose, Gayle James and Jordan Mantell.

Plot
The film is about a young woman (Gayle James) running away from her past and moves in with a woman (Leigh Rose) who is suffering from Alzheimer's disease and she believes is her granddaughter.

Cast
Leigh Rose as Jean
Gayle James as Edie
Jordan Mantell as Cal
Brian Mason as Bill
Christine Kellogg-Darrin as Faye
Jack Cornelius as Horace
Jen Davis as Rita
Jennifer Davis as Edie's Mom
Josh Davis as Jon
Jayme Rhae Edwards as Younger Jean
Mark Fier as Neighborhood Boy
Olivia Lauletta as Young Edie
Candice Rose as Young Jean
Bryan Ryan as Rick
Tracy Schmetterer as Shelly
Owen Sholar as Young Michael

Background
When the film was originally in development (approximately 8 years), the film had numerous A-list actors attached to the film, including Mandy Moore, Mark Ruffalo, Diane Keaton, and Tony Goldwyn.

Exhibition
In 2011, the film appeared in numerous film festivals, has found distribution, and will be released on DVD in May 2012 nationwide. In an interview with KABC television, Mason said, "We are going to be all over the planet, I think, in May. DVD, Netflix, I think it's going to be on the moon. It's everywhere."

Film festivals
Idyllwild Independent Festival - Winner Best Screenplay
Binational Independent Film Festival - En Certain Regard 
Beloit International Film Festival
Los Angeles Women's International Film Festival
Newport Beach Film Festival
Waterfront Film Festival
Alaska International Film Awards - Winner of the Denali Award
Silent River Film Festival
Rivers' Edge Film Festival - Winner 'Best Of The Fest' - Narrative Feature
Prescott Film Festival

See also
Alzheimer's disease

References

External links

Alison Mason interview with George Pennacchio (KABC) television

2011 films
2011 drama films
Films shot in California
American drama films
2010s English-language films
2010s American films